Achatinella livida is an extinct species of air-breathing land snail, a terrestrial pulmonate gastropod mollusk in the family Achatinellidae. This species was endemic to Oahu, Hawaii.

References

External links

†livida
Extinct gastropods
Taxonomy articles created by Polbot
ESA endangered species